George Christopher Hindley Hill (born 24 January 2001) is an English cricketer. He made his first-class debut on 15 August 2020, for Yorkshire in the 2020 Bob Willis Trophy. Prior to his first-class debut, Hill was the vice-captain of England's squad at the 2020 Under-19 Cricket World Cup. He made his Twenty20 debut on 30 August 2020, for Yorkshire in the 2020 t20 Blast. He made his List A debut on 22 July 2021, for Yorkshire in the 2021 Royal London One-Day Cup.

In April 2022, in the 2022 County Championship, Hill scored his maiden century in first-class cricket, with an unbeaten 151 against Northamptonshire.

References

External links
 

2001 births
Living people
English cricketers
Yorkshire cricketers
Cricketers from Keighley